Premsutra is a 2013 Marathi romantic film directed by Tejas Prabha Vijay Deoskar.  Produced by Kshitij Entertainment in association with Kathakaar, the film features Sandeep Kulkarni, Pallavi Subhash, Lokesh Gupte, Shruti Marathe, Shubha Khote, and Shishir Sharma in lead roles.

Plot
As the name suggests, the film is a romantic film starring Sandeep Kulkarni and Pallavi Subhash. The film is directed by Tejas Deoskar and is a fun ride in the world of romance.

Cast
 Sandeep Kulkarni as Anand 
 Pallavi Subhash as  Saniya
 Lokesh Gupte as Sujit 
 Shruti Marathe as Malavika
 Shubha Khote as Saniya Grandmother
 Shishir Sharma as Malavika Father

Critical response
Premsutra received mostly positive reviews maharashatra times give 3 out of 5 star

References

External links
 

2013 films
2010s Marathi-language films